Edgar Gray may refer to:

Edgar Harkness Gray (1813–1894), American clergyman
Dunc Gray (1906–1996), Edgar "Dunc" Gray,  Australian track cyclist